Dame Teresa Lesley Rees, DBE, FAcSS, FLSW (born June 1949) is a British social scientist, and a professor at Cardiff University. She specialises in the analysis of gender equality within education, training and labour market policies.

Career
She is professor emerita in the School of Social Sciences at Cardiff University. She served as principal investigator for the Women Adding Value to the Economy (WAVE) project, was a visiting professor at Sweden's GEXcel International Collegium for Advanced Transdisciplinary Gender Studies, and was director of the Leadership Foundation for Higher Education.

A former Equal Opportunities commissioner, she received the Welsh Woman of the Year Award for "outstanding contributions to women in Wales", and in 2002 was made a CBE for her work on equal opportunities and higher education. In January 2015, she was made a Dame Commander of the Order of the British Empire (DBE) "for services to social sciences".

References

1946 births
Living people
Dames Commander of the Order of the British Empire
Date of birth missing (living people)
Place of birth missing (living people)
Academics of Cardiff University
British social scientists